Anisolabella braueri is a species of earwig in the genus Anisolabella, the family Anisolabididae, the suborder Forficulina, and the order Dermaptera. Primarily found in the Afrotropical realm, this species was first classified by Zacher in 1911.

References 

Anisolabididae
Insects described in 1911